Zagórki  is a village in the administrative district of Gmina Pęczniew, within Poddębice County, Łódź Voivodeship, in central Poland.

References

Villages in Poddębice County